André Beronneau (1886–1973) was a French painter active during the first half of the 20th century. He is famous for his sumptuous French landscapes of southern Brittany and Provence. He exhibited his works at the Salon des Indépendants in Paris between 1926 and 1935.

Œuvres 

 Saint-Tropez-Vieille tour, Musée Alfred-Canel (Pont-Audemer, 27)

Notes

Sources and external links
 Artnet Photos of André Beronneau's artworks.
 Findartinfo André Beronneau's artworks in auctions.

1886 births
19th-century French painters
French male painters
20th-century French painters
20th-century French male artists
Modern painters
1973 deaths
19th-century French male artists